The first Robertson ministry was the sixth ministry of the Colony of New South Wales, and was led by John Robertson. It was the first of five occasions that Robertson was Premier. Robertson was elected in the first free elections for the New South Wales Legislative Assembly held in March 1856.

The title of Premier was widely used to refer to the Leader of Government, but not enshrined in formal use until 1920.

There was no party system in New South Wales politics until 1887. Under the constitution, ministers were required to resign to recontest their seats in a by-election when appointed. Such ministerial by-elections were usually uncontested and on this occasion John Robertson (The Upper Hunter), William Arnold (The Paterson) and Elias Weekes (West Maitland) were all re-elected unopposed.

This ministry covers the period from 9 March 1860 until 9 January 1861, when Robertson resigned his commission.

Composition of ministry

 
Ministers are members of the Legislative Assembly unless otherwise noted.

See also

Self-government in New South Wales
Members of the New South Wales Legislative Assembly, 1860–1864
Second Robertson ministry (1868–1870)
Third Robertson ministry (1875–1877)
Fourth Robertson ministry (1877)
Fifth Robertson ministry (1885–1886)

References

 

New South Wales ministries
1860 establishments in Australia
1861 disestablishments in Australia